Pierre d'Alcantara Charles Marie, Prince d'Arenberg, duc d'Arenberg, (Paris 2 October 1790 – Brussels 27 September 1877).

Pierre d'Alcantara Charles, was born on 2 October 1790 as 3rd son of Louis Engelbert, 6th Duke of Arenberg. He entered into the service of France. He distinguished himself during the campaigns in Spain and followed the Emperor Napoleon the Russian campaign, as an officer of ordinance. Made a peer of France on 25 November 1827, (Duke-Peer 1828) he became a naturalized French subject by order of King Charles X, 28 February 1828.

He was a member of the French Chamber of Peers.

He founded a new branch of the House of Arenberg and his descendants still bear his title.

Marriage and children 
He married twice. The first marriage took place in Paris on 27 January 1829, to Alix Marie Charlotte de Talleyrand (born on 4 November 1808, died on 21 September 1842) and had four children. The second marriage was on June 19, 1860, to Caroline Léopoldine Jeanne, princesse de Kaunitz-Rietberg-Questenberg (1801-1875).

His children were these:
 Marie Nicolette (1830-1905), married Charles de Mérode, Marquis de Westerloo
 Ernest Marie (1833-1837)
 Louis Charles (1837-1870), murdered at St. Petersburg
 Auguste-Louis-Albéric (1837-1924), married Jeanne Marie Louise de Greffulhe

References

1790 births
1877 deaths
French military personnel of the Napoleonic Wars